Fude Zhengshen (lit. Righteous God of Virtue and Blessing) is a God of Prosperity in Chinese folk religion. He is often considered to be similar as Tu Di Gong (Earth Deities) or the name was considered as an official title of the later, but actually both of them are deities of different ranking. As one of the oldest deity by age, he is often considered as subordinate of Houtu.

Legends
One of the legend said that there was a man who lived under the reign of King Wu of Zhou; his name was Zhang Fu De. He was born at 1143 BC on the second year of King Wu's reign, on the second day of second month of Chinese Calendar. He was a bright yet kind hearted as a kid. When he was 7 years old, he already learned old Chinese Classics and empathized the poor. Zhang Fu De became a government tax officer when he was 36 and he was a wise and good officer and people loved him. He died when he was 102 years old at 1042 BC on the reign of King Cheng of Zhou. But after three days, his deceased body had not rotten and amazed all the people.

His position was taken by Wei Chao that oppressed people by his greedy and cruelty character. Many people left their homeland and farms, and they wished to had a wise new officer just like Zhang Fu De. They worshiped him and called him Fude Zhengshen. One poor family had wished to built an altar for him, but they just could afford four pieces of bricks to built. They used three bricks as the walls and one as the roof, wrote down the name of Fude Zhengshen inside it and use a broken crock as tripod to put the incense. Unexpectedly, the poor family became rich and many people turned to believed on Zhang Fu De; built a temple for him. A poem said that the kindness of Zhang Fu De moved Jade Emperor whose in turned sent Ba Xian to picked him up to heaven.

Cult
Both Fude Zhengshen and Tudigong are described as sitting white haired old men with white long beard. The main differences between the two deities are that Fude Zhengshen is a wealth deity with no connection to the earth while Tudigong are a group of low-ranking earth deities with limited length of service. While Fude Zhengshen's altar is placed high above the floor; Tudigong's altar are built just on the ground and usually accompanied by Tudipo his wife and Hu Ye or tiger deity who will assist Tudigong to ward off evil.

References

Chinese gods
Fortune gods